Captain Clegg (released as Night Creatures in the United States) is a 1962 British adventure horror film directed by Peter Graham Scott and produced by Hammer Film Productions. It is loosely based on Doctor Syn, created by Russell Thorndike, and stars Peter Cushing, Yvonne Romain and Patrick Allen.

Plot
In 1776, a mulatto sailor is marooned on an island after assaulting the wife of pirate captain Nathaniel Clegg.

By 1792, Clegg has supposedly been captured by the Royal Navy and hanged. His resting place is the coastal village of Dymchurch on the Romney Marsh. The surrounding countryside is home to the "Marsh Phantoms": figures on horseback who ride by night and bring terror to the village.

Captain Collier and his band of sailors arrive in Dymchurch to investigate reports that the locals are involved in the smuggling of alcohol, from France. They are accompanied by the mulatto, mute after his tongue was cut out sixteen years earlier, whom Collier saved from death and now keeps as a slave. As Collier's men ransack an ale house run by Rash and his ward Imogène, the mulatto uncovers a hidden cellar. Ostensibly a varnish store, this is connected by a secret passageway to the home of coffin-maker Jeremiah Mipps, which serves as the smugglers' headquarters. The smugglers are led by the village parson Dr Blyss, whom the mulatto inexplicably attacks before being subdued by the sailors.

That night, the smugglers succeed in transporting a consignment to a nearby windmill for onward shipment, although squire's son Harry, Imogène's secret fiancé, is wounded when he is shot in the arm by the pursuing Collier. Back at the ale house, Rash kills one of the sailors to prevent the smuggling operation from being exposed. This frees the mulatto, who leaves for the churchyard to break open Clegg's grave. Collier, who spent years chasing Clegg, becomes suspicious of Blyss when the mulatto later makes a second attempt on the parson's life.

At Blyss's house, Rash finds Clegg's last will and testament. Learning that Imogène is Clegg's daughter, he attempts to take advantage of her compromised situation to rape her, but she escapes and flees to Blyss’s home. There, Blyss and Harry both tell her they were already aware of her relationship to Clegg. After consoling Imogène, Harry confronts Rash but is arrested by Collier when the captain notices the young man's bandaged arm. Harry is led away to Collier's ship as a hostage but escapes when the Marsh Phantoms appear, distracting the sailors. The Phantoms, who are actually villagers in disguise, take Harry and Imogène to the church, where they are hurriedly married by Blyss before leaving to start their life together.

Collier arrives at the church and announces that Clegg's grave is empty. He then tears off Blyss's collar to reveal the rope burns from an unsuccessful hanging, exposing the parson as Clegg. Clegg declares that his executioner spared his life and that he wished only to help the inhabitants of Dymchurch live comfortably. A struggle breaks out between the villagers and the sailors, enabling Clegg to flee with Mipps via the secret passageway. However, on emerging at the coffin-maker's house they run into the mulatto, who has murdered Rash and fatally impales Clegg with a spear before being shot dead by Mipps. In the film's closing scene, the villagers look on and Collier and the sailors salute as Mipps sorrowfully places Clegg's body in the open grave.

Cast
Peter Cushing as Parson Blyss/Captain Clegg
Yvonne Romain as Imogene
Patrick Allen as Captain Collier
Oliver Reed as Harry
Michael Ripper as Mipps
David Lodge as Bosun
Derek Francis as Squire
Jack MacGowran as Frightened man
Peter Halliday as 1st sailor
Martin Benson as Rash
Daphne Anderson as Mrs. Rash
Milton Reid as Mulatto
Terry Scully as 2nd sailor
Rupert Osborn as Gerry
Sydney Bromley as Tom Ketch
Gordon Rollings as Wurzel
Bob Head as Peg-leg
Colin Douglas as Pirate bosun
Kate O'Mara as Girl at Inn (uncredited)

Production

Filming occurred at Bray Studios in Berkshire.

Release

Home media
In North America, the film was released on 6 September 2005 along with seven other Hammer horror films on the 4-DVD set The Hammer Horror Series (ASIN: B0009X770O), which is part of MCA-Universal's "Franchise Collection". This set was re-released on Blu-ray September 13, 2016.

A Blu-ray was released in the UK on 23 June 2014 by Final Cut Entertainment. In 2021, Powerhouse Films re-released the film on Blu-Ray, along with The Shadow of the Cat, The Phantom of the Opera, and Nightmare, as part of Hammer Volume Six: Night Shadows boxset.

Reception

Variety was moderately positive, writing that the film had a "good" screenplay and "savvy" direction, "and the range of technical credits are all on the plus side, especially Arthur Grant's photography." The Monthly Film Bulletin was negative, writing, "The script is feeble, the acting, apart from Patrick Allen's forceful hero, uninspired, and the obsession with injury, degradation and death more dispiriting than ever."

Among later reviews, author and film critic Leonard Maltin awarded the film two and a half out of four stars, calling it "good fun with some scary moments." Donald Guarisco from Allmovie called it "one of the best Hammer Films productions", praising the film's imaginative script, and colorful characterizations.

References

External links
 

1962 films
Hammer Film Productions horror films
1962 horror films
Films about hoaxes
Folk horror films
Films set in 1776
Films set in 1792
Films set on beaches
Remakes of British films
Universal Pictures films
British historical horror films
Films set in England
Films shot at Bray Studios
1960s historical horror films
1960s English-language films
1960s British films